The 2011–12 Faysal Bank T20 Cup was the eighth season of the Faysal Bank T20 Cup in Pakistan, sponsored by Faysal Bank. The season was to begin in the final week of September in Lahore but due to an outbreak of dengue fever, the tournament was shifted to Karachi instead. The winning team received ₨ 2.5 million as prize money and while the runners-up received ₨ 1 million.

Venue
21 matches were played at National Stadium, Karachi.

Squads
List of cricketers who represented their teams.

Group A

Younus Khan (c)
Abdul Manan
Adnan Raees
Asif Afridi
Ahmed Jamal
Fawad Khan (wk)
Ghulam Mohammad
Junaid Khan
Khalid Usman
Khurshid Anwar
Mir Azam
Nabeeullah
Rehan Afridi
Sajjad Ali
Sohail Akthar
Wajid Ali
Yasir Hameed
Yasir Shah

Faisal Iqbal (c)
Adnan Baig (wk)
Akbar-ur-Rehman
Anwar Ali
Asif Zakir
Atif Maqbool
Azam Hussain
Danish Kaneria
Farhan Iqbal
Hasan Raza
Khurram Manzoor
Mohammad Waqas
Rameez Aziz
Sheharyar Ghani
Tabish Khan
Tahir Khan
Uzair-ul-Haq
Wajihuddin

Imran Farhat (c)
Abid Ali
Adnan Akmal
Ali Azmat
Asif Ashfaq
Asif Raza
Azhar Ali
Emmad Ali
Hamza Paracha
Junaid Zia
Kamran Sajid
Kashif Mahmood
Mohammad Hamza
Mustafa Iqbal
Saad Nasim
Taufeeq Umar
Waqas Aslam
Wasif Butt

Bismillah Khan (c/wk)
Abid Ali
Arun Lal
Faizullah
Fareed-ud-din
Gul Mohammad
Imran Khan
Matiullah Khan
Mir Wais
Mohammad Asif
Mohammad Zahir
Mohibullah
Munir Ahmed
Nasrullah Khan
Saeed Khan
Sher Hasan
Taimur Khan
Taimur Siddiq

Group B

 
Mohammad Nabi (c)
Abdullah
Fazal Niyazai
Gulbudeen Naib
Hamid Hassan
Karim Sadiq
Mohammad Sami
Najibullah Zadran
Najib Taraki
Nasim Khan
Qasim Khan
Samiullah Shenwari
Sayed Shirzad
Yamin Ahmadzai
Abdullah Adil
Abdur Mangal
Afsar Zazai
Nawab Khan
Rahmat Shah

Misbah-ul-Haq (c)
Abdur Rauf
Asad Ali
Asif Ali
Asif Hussain
Imran Khalid
Jahandad Khan
Khurram Shehzad
Mohammad Hafeez
Mohammad Salman (wk)
Mohammad Shahid
Mohammad Talha
Naved Latif
Sabir Hussain
Saeed Ajmal
Shahid Muzaffar (wk)
Shahid Nazir
Waqas Maqsood

Shabbir Ahmed (c)
Ansar Javed
Bilal Khilji (wk)
Faisal Elahi
Gulraiz Sadaf
Haziq Habibullah
Kamran Hussain
Mohammad Irfan
Mohammad Irshad
Mohammad Sami
Mohammad Zahid
Moinuddin
Naved Yasin
Taimur Ahmed
Zain Abbas
Zulfiqar Babar

Sohail Tanvir (c)
Adil Zarif
Adnan Mufti
Awais Zia
Babar Naeem
Hammad Azam
Jamal Anwar (wk)
Mohammad Nawaz
Mohammad Rameez
Mohammad Saleem
Nasir Malik
Naved Malik
Sadaf Hussain
Samiullah
Tahir Mughal
Umar Amin
Yasim Murtaza
Zahid Mansoor

Group C

Azeem Ghumman (c)
Aqeel Anjum
Faisal Athar
Ghulam Yasin
Jamshed Baig
Kashif Pervez
Lal Kumar
Mansoor Malik
Mir Ali
Naeem-ur-Rehman
Nasir Awais
Nauman Ali
Rizwan Ahmed
Shahid Qambrani
Shahzad Haider
Sharjeel Khan
Suleman Baloch
Zahid Mahmood

Abdul Razzaq (c)
Aamer Hayat
Adnan Rasool
Ahmed Shehzad
Aizaz Cheema
Asif Yousuf
Imran Ali
Jahangir Mirza
Jamshed Ahmed
Kamran Akmal (wk)
Muzaffar Mahboob
Nasir Jamshed
Raza Ali Dar
Sohail Ahmed
Tanzeel Altaf
Umar Akmal
Usman Malik
Wahab Riaz

Shoaib Malik (c)
Abdur Rehman
Ali Khan
Faisal Naved
Haris Sohail
Imran Nazir
Kamran Younis
Mansoor Amjad
Mohammad Ayub
Rana Naved-ul-Hasan
Naved Arif
Qaiser Abbas
Raza Hasan
Rizwan Sultan
Sarfraz Ahmed
Shahid Yousuf
Shakeel Ansar (wk)
Yasir Aziz

Group D

Shahid Afridi (c)
Asad Shafiq
Ashraf Ali
Faraz Ahmed
Fawad Alam
Fazal Subhan
Haaris Ayaz
Javed Mansoor
Khalid Latif
Misbah Khan
Mohammad Sami
Rameez Raja
Rumman Raees
Sarfraz Ahmed (wk)
Shahzaib Hasan
Sohail Khan
Tanvir Ahmed
Tariq Haroon

Iftikhar Anjum (c)
Adnan Ijaz
Afaq Raheem
Ashar Zaidi
Imad Wasim
Junaid Nadir
Kamran Hussain
Moed Ahmed
Naeem Anjum (wk)
Nasrullah Khan
Nauman Masood
Raheel Majeed
Rizwan Malik
Sajid Ali
Sarmad Bhatti
Shan Masood
Umair Khan
Zohaib Ahmed

Umar Gul (c)
Aftab Alam
Akbar Badshah
Fawad Ali
Gauhar Ali (wk)
Iftikhar Ahmed
Israrullah
Jamaluddin
Khadim Jan
Mohammad Fayyaz
Musadiq Ahmed
Nasir Ahmed
Nauman Habib
Nawaz Ahmed
Noor-ul-Amin
Rafatullah Mohmand
Shoaib Khan
Zohaib Khan

Results

Teams and standings
The top team from each group qualify for the semi-finals. The top two teams from each group qualify for the 2012 Faysal Bank Super Eight T20 Cup.

 Qualified for semifinals

Knockout stage

Fixtures

Group stage

Group A

Group B

Group C

Group D

Knockout stage 
Semi-finals

Final

Statistics

Highest team totals
The following table lists the highest team scores during this season.

Broadcasting rights
All matches were taken place at the National Stadium, Karachi and all matches were telecasted live on GEO Super.

References

External links
 Pakistan Domestic Season 2011/12

2011 in Pakistani cricket
Domestic cricket competitions in 2011–12
2011-12 National T20 Cup
Pakistani cricket seasons from 2000–01